King David High School is a mixed voluntary aided Jewish ethos-based secondary school located in the Wavertree district of Liverpool, England. It provides Jewish education, but also admits and caters to students of other faiths.

Facilities
In September 2011, the primary and secondary moved into a new school building, as part of the Building Schools for the Future (BSF) programme. There are three floors in King David. On the ground floor, there are the "creative" subjects, including ICT, business, art, design technology, and PE. There is also the reception area, sixth form common room, and atrium. On the first floor, there are the humanities subjects (English, modern foreign languages, history, and geography). The second floor is the home to the mathematics rooms and science labs. All floors have "breakout" spaces, where classes can go to do project/group work. There are also ICT facilities, toilets, and water fountains on each floor.

Notable alumni

 Ian Broudie, singer-songwriter, musician, and record producer
 Malandra Burrows, actress and singer
 Guy Chambers, songwriter
 Simon Fishel, IVF professor
 Ron Hesketh, Anglican priest and former RAF Chaplain-in-Chief
 Jason Isaacs, actor
 Missy Bo Kearns, footballer for Liverpool FC Women
 Stuart Polak, Baron Polak, Conservative politician and member of the House of Lords
 Mark Simpson, composer and clarinet player
 Neal Skupski, tennis player
 David Wolfson, Baron Wolfson of Tredegar, politician, barrister, and life peer
 Michael Woodford, business executive

See also
Jewish day school
King David School (disambiguation), for other King David Schools

References

Jewish day schools
Jewish schools in England
Jews and Judaism in England
Secondary schools in Liverpool
Educational institutions established in 1954
1954 establishments in England
Voluntary aided schools in England